is a Japanese professional tennis player. She is the younger sister of Yurika Sema who retired from professional tennis in November 2015.

Her coach is Shunsuke Ogata. Her mother is Japanese and her father is French.

Sema, who is playing on the WTA Tour but mostly on the ITF Circuit, has tried for 16 times to qualify for a Grand Slam tournament, without success.

ITF Circuit finals

Singles 16 (10 titles, 6 runner-ups)

Doubles: 65 (37 titles, 28 runner-ups)

References

External links
 
 

1988 births
Living people
Japanese female tennis players
Japanese people of French descent
Sportspeople from Tokyo
21st-century Japanese women